Lyudmila Lebedeva (born 23 May 1990) is a Russian middle-distance runner. She competed in the 3000 metres steeplechase event at the 2015 World Championships in Athletics in Beijing, China.

References

External links

1990 births
Living people
Russian female middle-distance runners
Russian female steeplechase runners
World Athletics Championships athletes for Russia
Universiade medalists in athletics (track and field)
Place of birth missing (living people)
Universiade silver medalists for Russia
Russian Athletics Championships winners
Medalists at the 2013 Summer Universiade